DRSP may refer to:
Drug-resistant Streptococcus pneumoniae: A type of bacteria that they cause pneumonia
Drospirenone